Trevor Henry (born 7 May 1947) is a Jamaican cricketer. He played in one first-class and two List A matches for the Jamaican cricket team in 1976/77.

See also
 List of Jamaican representative cricketers

References

External links
 

1947 births
Living people
Jamaican cricketers
Jamaica cricketers
Place of birth missing (living people)